A hoe is an ancient and versatile agricultural and horticultural hand tool used to shape soil, remove weeds, clear soil, and harvest root crops. Shaping the soil includes piling soil around the base of plants (hilling), digging narrow furrows (drills) and shallow trenches for planting seeds or bulbs. Weeding with a hoe includes agitating the surface of the soil or cutting foliage from roots, and clearing the soil of old roots and crop residues. Hoes for digging and moving soil are used to harvest root crops such as potatoes.

Types

There are many kinds of hoes of varied appearances and purposes. Some offer multiple functions while others have only a singular and specific purpose.

There are two general types of hoe: draw hoes for shaping soil and scuffle hoes for weeding and aerating soil.

A draw hoe has a blade set at approximately a right angle to the shaft. The user chops into the ground and then pulls (draws) the blade towards them. Altering the angle of the handle can cause the hoe to dig deeper or more shallowly as the hoe is pulled. A draw hoe can easily be used to cultivate soil to a depth of several centimetres. A typical design of draw hoe, the "eye hoe", has a ring in the head through which the handle is fitted. This design has been used since Roman times.

A scuffle hoe is used to scrape the surface of the soil, loosen the top few centimetres, and to cut the roots of, remove, and disrupt the growth of weeds efficiently. These are primarily of two different designs: the Dutch hoe and the hoop hoe.

The term "hand hoe" most commonly refers to any type of light-weight, short-handled hoe, although it may be used simply to contrast hand-held tools against animal or machine pulled tools.

Draw hoes

 The typical farming and gardening hoe with a heavy, broad blade and a straight edge is known as the Italian hoe, grub hoe, grubbing hoe, azada (from Spanish), grab hoe, pattern hoe or dago hoe ("dago" being an ethnic slur referring to Italians, Spaniards, or Portuguese).
 The ridging hoe, also known as the Warren hoe and the drill hoe, is a triangular (point-down) or heart-shaped draw hoe that is particularly useful for digging narrow furrows ("drills") and shallow trenches for the planting of seeds or bulbs.
 The Paxton hoe is similar to the Italian hoe, but with a more rounded rectangular blade.
 The flower hoe has a very small blade, rendering it useful for light weeding and aerating around growing plants, so as not to disturb their shallow roots while removing weeds beyond the reach of the gardener's arm.
The hoedad, hoedag or hodag is a hoe-like tool used to plant trees. According to Hartzell (1987, p. 29), "The hoedag [was] originally called skindvic hoe... Hans Rasmussen, legendary contractor and timber farm owner, is credited with having invented the curved, convex, round-nosed hoedag blade which is widely used today" (emphasis added).
 The mortar hoe is a tool specific to the manual mixing of mortar and concrete, and has the appearance of a typical square-bladed draw hoe with the addition of large holes in the blade.

Scuffle hoes

 The Dutch hoe is designed to be pushed or pulled through the soil to cut the roots of weeds just under the surface. A Dutch hoe has a blade "sharp on every side so as to cut either forward and backward". The blade must be set in a plane slightly upwardly inclined in relation to the dual axis of the shaft. The user pushes the handle to move the blade forward, forcing it below the surface of the soil and maintaining it at a shallow depth by altering the angle of the handle while pushing. A scuffle hoe can easily cultivate the soil and remove weeds from the surface layer.
 The hoop hoe, also known as the "action hoe", oscillating, hula, stirrup, pendulum weeder, or "swivel hoe") has a double-edge blade that bends around to form a rectangle attached to the shaft. Weeds are cut just below the surface of the soil as the blade is pushed and pulled. The back and forth motion is highly effective at cutting weeds in loose or friable soil. The head is a loop of flat, sharpened strap metal. However, it is not as efficient as a draw hoe for moving soil.
 The collinear hoe or collineal hoe has a narrow, razor-sharp blade which is used to slice the roots of weeds by skimming it just under the surface of the soil with a sweeping motion; it is unsuitable for tasks like soil moving and chopping. It was designed by Eliot Coleman in the late 1980s.
 The swoe hoe is a modern, one-sided cutting hoe, being a variant of the Dutch hoe.

Other hoes

Hoes resembling neither draw nor scuffle hoes include:

 Wheel hoes are, as the name suggests, a hoe or pair of hoes attached to one or more wheels. The hoes are frequently interchangeable with other tools. The historic manufacturer of the wheel hoe was Planet JR, these wheel hoes are still produced by Hoss Tools.

 Horse hoes, resembling small ploughs, were a favourite implement of agricultural pioneer Jethro Tull, who claimed in his book "Horse Hoeing Husbandry" that "the horse-hoe will, in wide intervals, give wheat throughout all the stages of its life, as much nourishment as the discreet hoer pleases." The modern view is that, rather than nutrients being released, the crop simply benefits from the removal of competing plants. The introduction of the horse hoe, together with the better-known seed drill, brought about the great increase farming productivity seen during the British Agricultural Revolution.
 Fork hoes (also known as prong hoes, tined hoes, Canterbury hoes, drag forks or bent forks) are hoes that have two or more tines at right angles to the shaft. Their use is typically to loosen the soil, prior to planting or sowing.
 Clam hoes, made for clam digging
 Adze hoes, with the basic hoe shape but heavier and stronger and with traditional uses in trail making.
 Pacul or cangkul (hoes similar to adze hoe from Malaysia and Indonesia)
 Gang hoes for powered use (in use at least from 1887 to 1964).

History
 Hoes are an ancient technology, predating the plough and perhaps preceded only by the digging stick. In Sumerian mythology, the invention of the hoe was credited to Enlil, the chief of the council of gods. The hand-plough (mr) was depicted in predynastic Egyptian art, and hoes are also mentioned in ancient documents like the Code of Hammurabi (ca. 18th century BC) and the Book of Isaiah (c. 8th century BC).

The human damage caused by long-term use of short-handled hoes, which required the user to bend over from the waist to reach the ground. Over time this could cause permanent, crippling lower back pain to farm workers. Over time this resulted in change after a struggle led by César Chávez with  the political help from Governor Jerry Brown in the California Supreme Court. They declared that the short-handled hoe was an unsafe hand tool which was than banned under California law in 1975.

Archaeological use

Over the past fifteen or twenty years, hoes have become increasingly popular tools for professional archaeologists. While not as accurate as the traditional trowel, the hoe is an ideal tool for cleaning relatively large open areas of archaeological interest.  It is faster to use than a trowel, and produces a much cleaner surface than an excavator bucket or shovel-scrape, and consequently on many open-area excavations the once-common line of kneeling archaeologists trowelling backwards has been replaced with a line of stooping archaeologists with hoes.

See also 
 Backhoe
 Hoe-farming
 Hoedads Reforestation Cooperative
 Homi
 Mattock
 Pitchfork
 Rake (tool)
 Rotary hoe (aka rotary tiller or cultivator)
 Tree planting bar
 Weeder

Notes

References

Further reading
 Evans, Chris, “The Plantation Hoe: The Rise and Fall of an Atlantic Commodity, 1650–1850,” William and Mary Quarterly, (2012) 69#1 pp 71–100.

External links

 "Scuffle hoe" or "Dutch hoe" as defined by Memidex/WordWeb dictionary/thesaurus
 Photographs of horse hoes at Scales And Rural Museum

Gardening tools